Dowrahak (also Romanized as Dowrāhak, Do Rāhak, and Dorāhak) is a city in the Central District of Deyr County, Bushehr province, Iran. At the 2006 census, its population was 3,841 in 787 households, when it was a village in Howmeh Rural District. The following census in 2011 counted 4,413 people in 1,127 households. The latest census in 2016 showed a population of 4,852 people in 1,361 households, by which time Dowrahak had risen to the status of a city.

References 

Cities in Bushehr Province
Populated places in Deyr County